Dr. Anil Sahasrabudhe is the present chairman of EC National Assessment and Accreditation CouncilEducational (NAAC).

Career
Sahasrabudhe graduated from BVB College of Engineering and Technology, Hubli, under Karnataka University with a bachelor's degree in mechanical engineering and was a gold medalist. Thereafter, he obtained a master's degree and doctorate from Indian Institute of Science, Bangalore.

Prior to joining College of Engineering, Pune (CoEP), Sahasrabudhe was a member of faculty at IIT Guwahati for 11 years. He was also a lecturer at NERIST, Itanagar. He served as the director of CoEP from 2005 to 2015. He was also chairman of the empowered Basic Science Research (BSR) Committee of the UGC. He was also chairman BoG, NIT-Arunachal Pradesh, He was Chairman of AICTE till September 1, 2022. Currently from 2nd September 2022 he is the chairman of NETF.

Awards and fellowships

National Merit Scholarship from 1973 to 1980
First rank in all ten semesters during B.E. (Karnataka University)
Karnataka University Gold Medal and Cash Prize
Adjudged as the Best Student in the Engineering College (1980) and received a Rolling Shield.
U.G.C. Fellowship during Doctoral Programme
Received Maha-Intrapreneur Award 2011 of Praj Industries
Received Edupreneur Award 2013 from Engineering Watch
Received Jeevan Gaurav Puraskar, Life Time Achievement Award of MIT World Peace University
Received Gandhian Peace Award of CSR Times and Indian Achievers Forum

Memberships of professional bodies, societies and committees

Life Member, Acoustical Society of India : LM-267
Life Member, Indian Society for Technical Education : LM-11116
Served as Chairman of I.S.T.E., North Eastern Regional Institute of Science and Technology (NERIST), Itanagar Chapter
Fellow, Institution of Engineers : F/108821/8
Member, ASME : 100078512
Fellow, Institution of Engineering and Technology
Fellow, Indian National Academy of Engineering (INAE)

References

External links
Dr. Anil Sahasrabudhe's profile

Living people
Engineers from Karnataka
Year of birth missing (living people)
Indian Institute of Science alumni
People from Hubli
Karnatak University alumni
Indian mechanical engineers
Indian educators